"Brute" is a song by industrial rock group KMFDM that was first released on their 1995 album Nihil. It was also released as a single with the song "Revolution" as B-side.

Track listing

1995 release

The 12" release contains the same tracks but in a different order.

2009 7" reissue

Track 1 is a shorter mix of the Original Album-Mix which does not contain the noise heard at the end of the song. This noise served as a transition to the next song, "Trust".

2014 12" release

1995 singles
KMFDM songs
TVT Records singles
1995 songs
Wax Trax! Records singles
Songs written by Sascha Konietzko
Songs written by Pig (musical project)
Songs written by Günter Schulz
Songs written by En Esch